Grüenfeld is a railway station in the Swiss canton of Zurich and municipality of Richterswil. The station is on the Wädenswil to Einsiedeln railway line, which is owned by the Südostbahn. The station is served by Zurich S-Bahn service S13, from Einsiedeln to Wädenswil.

References 

Grüenfeld
Grüenfeld
Richterswil